Trevor Asher Kletz, OBE, FREng, FRSC, FIChemE (23 October 1922–31 October 2013) was a prolific British author on the topic of chemical engineering safety. He is credited with introducing the concept of inherent safety, and was a major promoter of Hazop.  He is listed in The Palgrave Dictionary of Anglo-Jewish History.

Early life and education

Kletz was born 23 October 1922 in Darlington of Jewish parents, from a Russian immigrant background. He attended The King's School, Chester, then the University of Liverpool, where he graduated in chemistry in 1944 and joined ICI the same year.  During the Second World War, he was a member of the Home Guard.  On 28 October 1958 he married Denise V. Winroope (died 1980) and they had two sons, Anthony and Nigel.

Professional life

In ICI he worked initially as a research chemist, then became plant manager (in turn) of iso-octane, acetone and tar acids plants.  After further experience in process investigation and commissioning in the Technical Department, in 1961 he became assistant works manager on the ICI Olefines Works near Wilton, Redcar and Cleveland.  In 1968, he was appointed the first Technical Safety Advisor.

During this time, ICI developed hazard and operability studies, now known as Hazop, for which he was an enthusiastic advocate, and the author of the first book on the subject.

When he retired in 1982 he had established a safety culture within the company based on communication, and had begun a second career and an international reputation as an author and speaker.  Most of his books are concerned with case studies from industry and the human and technical causes.  Shortly after his retirement he expanded a paper entitled "What you don't have, can't leak" into the book which began the concept of inherent safety.

Honours
He was a Fellow of the Royal Academy of Engineering, the Royal Society of Chemistry, the Institution of Chemical Engineers, and the American Institute of Chemical Engineers.  He was awarded medals by the latter two institutions.

He was a visiting Professor of Chemical Engineering at Loughborough University and an adjunct professor of the Texas A&M University Artie McFerrin Department of Chemical Engineering.

In 1997 he was awarded the OBE for 'services to industrial safety'.

In 2009 he received the Mond Award for Health and Safety of the Society of Chemical Industry, where he was said to be a 'founding father' of safety in the chemical industry.

Books (sole author)
Cheaper, safer plants, or wealth and safety at work: notes on inherently safer and simpler plants (1984) IChemE 
Improving Chemical Engineering Practices: A New Look at Old Myths of the Chemical Industry (1989) Taylor & Francis, ;
Critical Aspects of Safety and Loss Prevention (1990) Butterworths ;
Plant Design for Safety – a user-friendly approach (1991) Taylor & Francis ;
Lessons from Disaster – How Organisations Have No Memory and Accidents Recur (1993) IChemE ;
Learning from Accidents (1994/2001) Butterworth-Heinemann ;
Dispelling Chemical Engineering Myths (1996) Taylor & Francis, ;
Process Plants – a handbook for inherently safer design (1998) Taylor & Francis ;
What Went Wrong? Case Histories of Process Plant Disasters (1998) Gulf, ;
Hazop and Hazan 4th ed (1999) Taylor & Francis, ;
By Accident… a Life Preventing them in industry (2000) PFV, ;
An Engineer's View of Human Error 3rd ed (2001) IChemE, ;
Still Going Wrong: Case Histories of Process Plant Disasters and How They Could Have Been Avoided (2003) Gulf, 
What Went Wrong?: Case Histories of Process Plant Disasters and How They Could Have Been Avoided 5th ed (2009) Butterworth-Heinemann/IChemE ;

Books (joint author)

Trevor Kletz, Paul Chung, Eamon Broomfield and Chaim Shen-Orr (1995) Computer Control and Human Error  IChemE, ;
Trevor Kletz, Paul Amyotte (2010) Process Plants: A Handbook for Inherently Safer Design 2nd ed, CRC Press ;

References

External links
 U. S. Chemical Safety Board Statement from CSB Chairperson Rafael Moure-Eraso on the Passing of Noted Chemical Process Safety Expert Professor Trevor Kletz
 Trevor's Corner Mary Kay O'Connor Process Safety Center
 Loughborough University Oration on the award of an honorary degree 2006
 Loughborough University Brief biography and list of publications

1922 births
2013 deaths
People from Darlington
British Jews
Imperial Chemical Industries people
British chemical engineers
Alumni of the University of Liverpool
People educated at The King's School, Chester
Fellows of the Royal Academy of Engineering
Fellows of the Royal Society of Chemistry
Officers of the Order of the British Empire
Academics of Loughborough University
British people of Russian-Jewish descent
Fellows of the Institution of Chemical Engineers